Mimusops riparia is a species of plant in the family Sapotaceae. It is found in Kenya and Tanzania.

References

riparia
Vulnerable plants
Taxonomy articles created by Polbot